Stephan Figliuzzi (born 23 July 1968) is an Italian ice hockey player. He competed in the men's tournaments at the 1994 Winter Olympics and the 1998 Winter Olympics.

References

1968 births
Living people
Olympic ice hockey players of Italy
Ice hockey players at the 1994 Winter Olympics
Ice hockey players at the 1998 Winter Olympics
Ice hockey people from Montreal
Saint-Jean Castors players
Canadian people of Italian descent